Karuss is a neighbourhood in the city of Kristiansand in Agder county, Norway. It is located in the borough of Vågsbygd and in the district of Slettheia. Karuss is northwest of Kjerrheia, southwest of Gislemyr, west of Trekanten, and east of Nordtjønnåsen.

Transportation

References

Geography of Kristiansand
Neighbourhoods of Kristiansand